Graham Brown (October 24, 1924 – December 13, 2011) was an American actor known for his work in theatre.

Life and career 
He was born Robert E. Brown in New York, New York, and was a one-time boxer. He attended Howard University, where he earned a BA in theater. He also studied method acting at the Actors Studio in New York. He began his career as a Shakespearean actor at Guthrie Theater, where he appeared in productions such as Hamlet and Richard III. Brown was an original member of Negro Ensemble Company (NEC) and played in many NEC productions, including Malcochon by Derek Walcott, Ceremonies in Dark Old Men by Lonne Elder III, and District Line and The River Niger by Joseph A Walker. He was part of the original cast of controversial play Song of the Lusitanian Bogey by Peter Weiss, which toured Europe and was subject to a riot in a London theatre in August 1968. Graham Brown was often cast as professional and/or highly educated people such as doctors and clergymen.

One of his best remembered roles was as Jared Philibert, the 50-year-old patriarch of a Caribbean-American family in Steve Carter's critically acclaimed play Nevis Mountain Dew. He originated the role in NEC's Off-Broadway production and reprised the role in the West Coast premiere of the play.  For the latter he received a Los Angeles Drama Critics Circle Award for his performance.

Brown died on December 13, 2011, of pulmonary failure at the Lillian Booth Actors' Fund Nursing Home.

Selected credits

Theatre

Film

Television

References

External links

 
Graham Brown at the Internet Theatre Database
Graham Brown Papers at Stuart A. Rose Manuscript, Archives, and Rare Book Library

1924 births
2011 deaths
American male film actors
American male stage actors
American male television actors
Male actors from New York City
African-American male actors
Howard University alumni
20th-century African-American people
21st-century African-American people